The Left's Jewish Problem: Jeremy Corbyn, Israel and Anti‑Semitism is a 2016 book by Dave Rich. The book argues that new antisemitism is "masked as anti-Zionism" in left-wing politics.

Rich began writing the book in 2011 as his doctoral thesis at Birkbeck, University of London and his studies were funded by his employer, the Community Security Trust.

Rich traces the origin of contemporary left-wing anti-Semitic and anti-Israel rhetoric, and of antisemitism in the Labour Party to the early 1970s when Peter Hain and Louis Eaks of the Young Liberals wing of the Liberal Party described Zionism as a colonialist and imperialist project imposing apartheid on the indigenous Palestinian people. Rich argues anti-Zionism turned into anti-semitism and is used to hide it under the guise of the first. 

Philip Spencer, Professor of Holocaust and Genocide Studies at Kingston University, in reviewing the book, accuses the left of inverting reality to blame Jews, "the victims of the most murderous racism, were now the real racists, inverting the Holocaust." Nick Cohen described the book as an "authoritative history of left antisemitism but that "If Rich has a fault, it is that as a rational historian, he cannot speculate on the psychological appeal of left antisemitism" Leslie Wagner described it as "an important one that should be read by all those seeking to understand the New Left’s obsession with anti-Zionism and its inability to recognize, let alone deal with, its own antisemitism" and Benjamin Ramm wrote that "...as a guide to a contemporary malady that is undermining the integrity of the left, Rich’s book is essential reading"

References

2016 non-fiction books
Politics of Israel
Anti-Zionism
Racism in the United Kingdom
Antisemitism in the United Kingdom
New antisemitism
Books about Jeremy Corbyn
Left-wing antisemitism
Left-wing politics in the United Kingdom